may refer to:

Hitotsubashi, Chiyoda, a place in Chiyoda, Tokyo
Hitotsubashi Group, a publishing keiretsu
Hitotsubashi University
Hitotsubashi-Tokugawa, a branch of the Tokugawa Clan
Hitotsubashi Yoshinobu (Keiki), the last shōgun